Clonuncaria is a genus of moths belonging to the family Tortricidae.

Species
Clonuncaria cimolioptera Razowski, 1999
Clonuncaria coronae Razowski & Becker, 2011
Clonuncaria melanophyta  Meyrick, 1913

References

 , 2005: World Catalogue of Insects vol. 5 Tortricidae.
 , 1999, Acta zool. cracov. 42: 345.
 , 2011: Systematic and faunistic data on Neotropical Tortricidae: Phricanthini, Tortricini, Atteriini, Polyorthini, Chlidanotini (Lepidoptera: Tortricidae). Shilap Revista de Lepidopterologia 39 (154): 161-181.

External links
tortricidae.com

Polyorthini
Tortricidae genera
Taxa named by Józef Razowski